Octavia Waldo (full name Octavia Capuzzi Waldo Locke; born 1929) is an American writer and artist. She is best known for her 1961 novel, A Cup of the Sun.

Biography
She was born in 1929 in Philadelphia, Pennsylvania, the eighth child of Italian-American parents. She graduated with honors from the Tyler School of Fine Arts at Temple University, and from 1949 to 1950 was a Fulbright fellow at the American Academy in Rome. She has also been a fellow at the Bread Loaf Writers' Conference and a resident at Yaddo. Her artwork has been shown in galleries and is included in private collections; she taught art for many years in Washington D.C. Her first novel was published in 1961 under the name Octavia Waldo; other writings have appeared under the names Octavia Capuzzi and Octavia Capuzzi Locke. In A Cup of the Sun, the Italian-American female protagonist struggles "to achieve a level of autonomy unknown to her mother." Waldo's short stories and other writings have appeared in many journals and anthologies, including Helen Barolini's The Dream Book: An Anthology of Writings of Italian American Women (1985) and Don't Tell Mama: The Penguin Book of Italian American Writing (2002).

References

Further reading 
 

1929 births
American writers of Italian descent
American women novelists
Writers from Philadelphia
Temple University alumni
Living people
Novelists from Pennsylvania
21st-century American women
Fulbright alumni